The 2013 IIHF U18 World Championship Division I was a pair of international under-18 ice hockey tournaments organised by the International Ice Hockey Federation. The Division I A and Division I B tournaments represent the second and the third tier of the IIHF World U18 Championships.

Division I A
The Division I A tournament was played in Asiago, Italy, from 7 to 13 April 2013. Danish goalie George Sørensen scored a goal against France, joining Anton Khudobin as the only goaltenders ever to accomplish this feat in an IIHF event.

Participants

Final standings

Results
All times are local. (Central European Summer Time – UTC+2)

Division I B
The Division I B tournament was played in Tychy, Poland, from 14 to 20 April 2013.

Participants

Final standings

Results
All times are local. (Central European Summer Time – UTC+2)

References

2013 IIHF World U18 Championships
IIHF World U18 Championship Division I
International ice hockey competitions hosted by Italy
International ice hockey competitions hosted by Poland
World
World